State Road 116 (SR 116) is a State Road in the northern section of the US state of Indiana. The road connects Markle, Bluffton, and Geneva and passes through mostly farmland outside of cities and towns. SR 116 was originally introduced in the early 1930s routed between Markle and SR 3 north of Bluffton. The road was extended southeast to U.S. Highway 27 (US 27) in the late 1930s and early 1940s. In the mid-1940s the road was extended east to the Ohio state line, near New Corydon. This extension was removed between late 1990s and early 2000s, the east end of SR 116 was truncated to its current location at US 27.

Route description
SR 116 begins at an intersection with US 224, in the town of Markle. It heads southeast passing through Markle having an intersection with SR 3. East of SR 3, SR 116 leaves Huntington County and enters Wells County, before leaving Markle. East of Markle the road rural Wells County heading east-southeast, parallel to the Wabash River, and passing through farmland. SR 116 has an intersection with SR 124, the two state roads head east concurrent entering Bluffton.

In Bluffton the road crosses a railroad track before and intersection with SR 1 (Main Street). Both state roads turn south onto SR 1 passing through commercial properties before SR 124 turns east, while SR 116 continues south on Main Street with SR 1. The street crosses over the Wabash River, where SR 116 has its highest traffic count with a count of 22,793 vehicles on average daily in 2016. SR 1 and SR 116 enters downtown Bluffton, where the street passes east of the Wells County Courthouse. South of the courthouse the road passes through residential properties before the properties become commercial. SR 116 turns east while SR 1 continues south. SR 116 passes south of Metropolitan School District Bluffton-Harrison buildings before leaving Bluffton.

Past Bluffton the road bends to become southeast-northwest, parallel to the Wabash River and south of the Ouabache State Park. Southwest of Vera Cruz SR 116 has an intersection with SR 301 before leaving Wells County and entering Adams County. In Adams County SR 116 has an intersection with SR 218 before the road curves to become north-south, passing west of Linn Grove. The road heads south for around 4 miles before the road turns to become east-west passing through agriculture land. This segment of SR 116 has the lowest traffic count of the entire length of the state road at 803 vehicles on average daily in 2016. SR 116 enters Geneva, passing through residential properties, before the SR 116 designation ends at US 27.

History
SR 116 was originally designated between late 1930 and early 1932. The highway ran between SR 16 in Markle and SR 3, now SR 1, north of Bluffton. Between 1935 and 1936 the original segment of SR 116 was under construction to become to come paved. The road was extended east to Wells County State Forest, now Ouabache State Park, between 1936 and 1937. The Indiana State Highway Commission moved the road south between Bluffton and Wells County State Forest between 1939 and 1941. At this time an extension of SR 116 to the southeast occurred moving the eastern end to US 27 in Geneva. The road was extended east to the Ohio state line east of New Corydon, between 1942 and 1945. Between 1966 and 1967 the entire road east of Bluffton was paved. A short reroute on the southeast part of Bluffton to its modern routing occurred between 1993 and 1995. SR 116 east of US 27 was removed from the state road system between 1999 and 2000.

Major intersections

References

External links

116
Transportation in Adams County, Indiana
Transportation in Huntington County, Indiana
Transportation in Wells County, Indiana